Hollis Burke Frissell (July 14, 1852 – August 5, 1917)  was an American chaplain and college president. He served as the second president of Hampton Institute.

Career
He served as the school's chaplain, vice-principal, and then principal until his death in 1917. He was also part of the General Education Board, Southern Education Board, Negro Rural School Fund, Anna T. Jeanes Foundation, Calhoun Colored School, Penn Normal, Industrial and Agricultural School, Virginia Manual Labor School for the Negro Reformatory Association of Virginia, Mandingo Association, and served as  president of the New York Colonization Society. He corresponded with W. E. B. DuBois, Arthur Curtiss James, Kelly Miller, George Foster Peabody, John D. Rockefeller, President Theodore Roosevelt, and President William Howard Taft.

Personal life
He married Julia Frame in 1883 and they had one son.

A library at the Tuskegee Institute built in 1932 was named for him. It was eventually renovated and renamed the Ford Motor Company Library.

The Museum of Modern Art has a platinum print photograph of Frissell. He is depicted in a frieze by Evelyn Beatrice Longman at the Smithsonian Institution.

Further reading
Sketch of Hollis Burke Frissell by George Foster Peabody

References

External links 

1852 births
1917 deaths
Psi Upsilon
Presidents of Hampton University